Dragons of the Hourglass Mage  is a fantasy novel by Margaret Weis and Tracy Hickman, based on the Dragonlance fictional campaign setting. It is the third installment in the Lost Chronicles trilogy, which occurs between the storyline of the individual books (Dragons of Autumn Twilight, Dragons of Winter Night, and Dragons of Spring Dawning) which compose the Chronicles trilogy.  The events of this novel entirely take place during the same time frame as the events described in Dragons of Spring Dawning.

Plot introduction 
Dragons of the Hourglass Mage reveals the motivations behind Raistlin's aspirations to become a god.

After Raistlin Majere became a wizard  of the Black Robe, he travels to Neraka, the lord city of the Dark Queen, under the excuse of joining her forces, but in reality, he plots his own rise to power.  When Takhisis discovers that the dragon orb has entered her city, she dispatches Draconians to find it and to destroy the wizard who protects it.  However, Raistlin uncovers Takhisis' plot to seize control of all magic, and he moves to stop her.  Meanwhile, Kitiara uth Matar, Raistlin's older sister, follows Takhisis' orders to set a trap for the Gods of Magic on the Night of the Eye.

Characters 
Raistlin Majere
Kitiara uth Matar
Iolanthe
Talent Orren
Mari
Lord Soth
Par-Salian
Justarius
Ladonna

Reception

The book chronicles the significant maturation of the character between his introduction in Dragons of Spring Dawning and later appearances, addressing many previously-unanswered questions.

Bookwatch praised the narration of the audiobook version by Sandra Burr, saying, "Any fantasy audio library will welcome this."

External links

 Margaret Weis's homepage
Tracy Hickman's official website
Official Margaret Weis podcast
Tracy & Laura Hickman's DragonHearth podcast site.
Wizards.com  Sample chapter at Wizards of the Coast.

References

2009 American novels
American fantasy novels
Dragonlance novels
Novels by Margaret Weis
Novels by Tracy Hickman